Events in the year 1979 in Brazil.

Incumbents

Federal government
 President: General Ernesto Geisel (until 14 March), General João Figueiredo (starting 15 March)
 Vice President: General Adalberto Pereira dos Santos (until 14 March), Aureliano Chaves (starting 15 March)

Governors 
 Acre: 
 Alagoas: Geraldo Mello (till 15 March), Guilherme Palmeira (from 15 March)
 Amazonas: Henoch da Silva Reis (till 15 March), José Bernardino Lindoso (from 15 March)
 Bahia: Roberto Santos then Antônio Carlos Magalhães 
 Ceará: Waldemar Alcântara (until 15 March); Virgílio Távora (from 15 March)
 Espírito Santo: Élcio Álvares (until 15 March); Eurico Vieira Resende (from 15 March)
 Goiás: Irapuan Costa Jr. (until 15 March); Ary Valadão (from 15 March)
 Maranhão: Oswaldo da Costa Nunes Freire (until 15 March); João Castelo (from 15 March) 
 Mato Grosso: Cássio Leite de Barros then Frederico Campos 
 Mato Grosso do Sul: Harry Amorim Costa (until 12 June); Marcelo Miranda Soares (from 12 June)
 Minas Gerais: Levindo Ozanan Coelho (until 15 March); Francelino Pereira (from 15 March)
 Pará: Clóvis Rego (until 15 March); Alacid Nunes (from 15 March)
 Paraíba: Dorgival Terceiro Neto (until 15 March); Tarcísio Burity (from 15 March)
 Paraná: Jaime Canet Júnior then Nei Braga 
 Pernambuco: Francisco Moura Cavalcanti (until 15 March); Marco Maciel (from 15 March)
 Piauí: Djalma Veloso (until 15 March); Lucídio Portela (from 15 March)
 Rio de Janeiro: Floriano P. Faria Lima then Antônio Chagas Freitas  
 Rio Grande do Norte: Tarcisio de Vasconcelos Maia (until 15 March); Lavoisier Maia (from 15 March)
 Rio Grande do Sul: Sinval Sebastião Duarte Guazzelli (until 15 March); José Augusto Amaral de Souza (from 15 March)
 Santa Catarina: Antônio Carlos Konder Reis (until 15 March); Jorge Bornhausen	(from 15 March) 
 São Paulo: Paulo Egídio Martins (until 15 March); Paulo Maluf (from 15 March)
 Sergipe: José Rollemberg (until 15 March); Augusto Franco (from 15 March)

Vice governors
 Acre: Omar Sabino de Paula (until 15 March); José Fernandes Rego (from 15 March)
 Alagoas: Antônio Guedes Amaral (until 15 March); Teobaldo Vasconcelos Barbosa (from 15 March)
 Amazonas: João Bosco Ramos de Lima (until 15 March); Paulo Pinto Nery (from 15 March)
 Bahia: Edvaldo Brandão Correia (until 15 March); Luis Viana Neto (from 15 March)
 Ceará: José Waldemar de Alcântara e Silva (until 15 March); Manuel de Castro Filho (from 15 March)
 Espírito Santo: Carlos Alberto Lindenberg von Schilgen (until 15 March); José Carlos Fonseca (from 15 March)
 Goiás: José Luís Bittencourt (until 15 March); Rui Brasil Cavalcanti (from 15 March)
 Maranhão: José Duailibe Murad (until 15 March); Artur Teixeira de Carvalho (from 15 March)
 Mato Grosso: Cássio Leite de Barros (until 15 March); José Vilanova Torres (from 15 March)
 Mato Grosso do Sul: vacant
 Minas Gerais: Levindo Ozanam Coelho (until 15 March); João Marques de Vasconcelos (from 15 March)
 Pará: Gerson dos Santos Peres (from 15 March)
 Paraíba: Clóvis Cavalcanti (from 15 March)
 Paraná: Octávio Cesário Pereira Júnior (until 15 March); José Hosken de Novaes (from 15 March)
 Pernambuco: Paulo Gustavo de Araújo Cunha (until 15 March); Roberto Magalhães Melo (from 15 March)
 Piauí: Genibaldo Barros (until 15 March); Waldemar de Castro Macedo (from 15 March)
 Rio de Janeiro: 
 Rio Grande do Norte: Geraldo Melo 
 Rio Grande do Sul: José Augusto Amaral de Sousa (until 15 March); Otávio Badui Germano (from 15 March)
 Santa Catarina: Marcos Henrique Büechler (until 15 March); Henrique Hélion Velho de Córdova (from 15 March)
 São Paulo: Ferreira Filho (until 15 March); José Maria Marin (from 15 March)
 Sergipe: Antônio Ribeiro Sotelo (until 15 March); Djenal Tavares Queiroz (from 15 March)

Events

Births
January 7 – Ricardo Maurício, racing driver
February 1 – Clodoaldo Silva, Paralympic swimmer
June 29 – Artur Avila, mathematician
July 27 – Marielle Franco, politician (died 2018)
August 16 – Eduardo Maiorino, mixed martial artist and kick-boxer (died 2012)

Deaths 
December 22 – Francisco Cavalcanti Pontes de Miranda, lawyer and diplomat, 87

References

See also 
1979 in Brazilian football
1979 in Brazilian television

 
1970s in Brazil
Years of the 20th century in Brazil
Brazil
Brazil